Mike Kloser (born December 31, 1959) is an American former professional downhill and cross-country mountain biker. He most notably finished second at the 1990 UCI Downhill World Championships. He also won the cross-country world championships in 1988 before it was recognized by the UCI.

After retiring from cycling, he competed in the duathlon and winter triathlon.

He was inducted into the Mountain Bike Hall of Fame in 2002.

Personal life
He resides in Vail, Colorado with his wife, Emily, and their children Heidi and Christian.

References

External links

1959 births
Living people
Downhill mountain bikers
American male cyclists
American mountain bikers
Sportspeople from Dubuque, Iowa